Acanthostachys pitcairnioides is a species in the genus Acanthostachys. It is found in north-eastern Brazil.

References 
BSI Cultivar Registry Retrieved 11 October 2009

Bromelioideae
Flora of Brazil